Palo is an unincorporated community in White Township, Saint Louis County, Minnesota, United States.

Geography
The community is located eight miles south of the city of Aurora at the intersection of Saint Louis County Road 100 and County Road 111 (Palo Road). Vermilion Trail/County Road 4 and County Road 16 are both nearby. Palo is located nine miles northeast of the community of Makinen.

History
A post office called Palo was established in 1907, and remained in operation until 1933. The name "Palo" is derived from Finnish, where palo means "fire (as in "forest fire")" and Palo is a surname and a place name.

Arts and culture
Palo is notable for its annual Laskiainen celebration, one of the largest and longest-running Finnish-American festivals in the United States.

References

 Rand McNally Road Atlas – 2007 edition – Minnesota entry
 Official State of Minnesota Highway Map – 2011/2012 edition
  

Unincorporated communities in Minnesota
Unincorporated communities in St. Louis County, Minnesota
Finnish-American culture in Minnesota